Woltemade may refer to:

People 
Nick Woltemade (born 2002), German footballer
Wolraad Woltemade (1708–1773), Cape Town farmer

Other 
Woltemade Decoration for Bravery, decoration and orders awarded in South Africa